In enzymology, a N6-methyl-lysine oxidase is an enzyme that catalyzes the chemical reaction

N6-methyl-L-lysine + H2O + O2  L-lysine + formaldehyde + H2O2

The 3 substrates of this enzyme are N6-methyl-L-lysine, H2O, and O2, whereas its 3 products are L-lysine, formaldehyde, and H2O2.

This enzyme belongs to the family of oxidoreductases, specifically those acting on the CH-NH group of donors with oxygen as acceptor.  The systematic name of this enzyme class is N6-methyl-L-lysine:oxygen oxidoreductase (demethylating). Other names in common use include epsilon-alkyl-L-lysine:oxygen oxidoreductase, N6-methyllysine oxidase, epsilon-N-methyllysine demethylase, epsilon-alkyllysinase, and 6-N-methyl-L-lysine:oxygen oxidoreductase (demethylating).

References

 

EC 1.5.3
Enzymes of unknown structure